The 1947–48 Middlebury Panthers men's ice hockey season was the 23rd season of play for the program but first under the oversight of the NCAA. The Panthers represented Middlebury College and were coached by Duke Nelson, in his 6th season.

Season
Middlebury's season began with a trip to Clinton, New York for a tournament held by Hamilton. The first two games could hardly have gone better for the Panthers as they pumped 39 goal into the net to post the two most overwhelming wins in program history. They concluded the series by defeated the host Continentals in a much closer game and began the year with a stirling record.

A week later, the team headed down to Boston to begin their conference slate and came away with mixed results. While they were swamped by Northeastern in the first game, the Panthers managed to pull out a victory against MIT the following night. By the end of the week they had returned to Vermont for their first two home games of the year and produced two more wins against in-state rivals. After coming from behind to force a tie with Williams, Jim Marchese broke a bone in his foot at practice and was expected to miss the remainder of the season.

he team did not play again until after the exam break. In their first game following the layoff, it appeared that the team had retained its form from earlier when they downed Union for the third time. However, they lost the very next evening to Norwich. The loss put them in 3rd place in the NEIHL standings but they had a rough road ahead. Before that happened, Middlebury wrapped up its unofficial state championship with a second won over Vermont. Unfortunately, the victory was bittersweet as Fluff Grocott joined Marchese on the injured list while Bill McNamara, the team's leading scorer, was removed from the team.

Middlebury ended its season with a southern swing and ended up losing its final three games of the year. While the loss to Army didn't harm the Panther's chances for a postseason bid, the whitewashing at the hands of Boston College meant that the team needed to beat Boston University in order to finish in the top four. Against all odds, Middlebury put forth a commendable performance versus one of the nation's top teams but fell just short, losing 4–5. The pair of losses dropped the Panthers to 6th place, just behind MIT and Bowdoin and signaled the end of the season.

Robert H. Shahan served as team manager.

Roster

Standings

Schedule and results

|-
!colspan=12 style=";" | Silver Anniversary Hamilton Tournament

|-
!colspan=12 style=";" | Regular Season

† Vermont fielded a club team at this time
‡ Union records have the score of the game as 14–0

References

Middlebury Panthers men's ice hockey seasons
Middlebury
Middlebury
Middlebury